Viktor Erdős (born 2 September 1987) is a Hungarian chess grandmaster. He won the Hungarian Chess Championship in 2011.

Chess career
Erdős was awarded the grandmaster title in 2007.

He qualified for the Chess World Cup 2017, where he defeated Bassem Amin in the first round.

External links
Viktor Erdős chess games at 365Chess.com

Living people
Chess grandmasters
Hungarian chess players
1987 births